East Arcadia is a town in Bladen County, North Carolina, United States. The population was 487 at the 2010 census.

Geography
East Arcadia is located at  (34.381523, -78.321612).

Demographics

As of the census of 2000, there were 524 people, 198 households, and 139 families residing in the town. The population density was 240.5 people per square mile (92.8/km2). There were 209 housing units at an average density of 95.9 per square mile (37.0/km2). The racial makeup of the town was 6.49% White, 92.18% African American, 0.19% Native American, and 1.15% from two or more races. Hispanic or Latino of any race were 2.86% of the population.

There were 198 households, out of which 36.4% had children under the age of 18 living with them, 33.8% were married couples living together, 32.3% had a female householder with no husband present, and 29.3% were non-families. 28.3% of all households were made up of individuals, and 8.1% had someone living alone who was 65 years of age or older. The average household size was 2.65 and the average family size was 3.25.

In the town, the population was spread out, with 32.4% under the age of 18, 8.4% from 18 to 24, 29.2% from 25 to 44, 19.5% from 45 to 64, and 10.5% who were 65 years of age or older. The median age was 30 years. For every 100 females, there were 77.6 males. For every 100 females age 18 and over, there were 77.9 males.

The median income for a household in the town was $19,583, and the median income for a family was $19,545. Males had a median income of $25,000 versus $17,625 for females. The per capita income for the town was $7,956. About 34.1% of families and 34.9% of the population were below the poverty line, including 45.8% of those under age 18 and 34.0% of those age 65 or over.

References

Towns in Bladen County, North Carolina
Towns in North Carolina